Dent's shrew (Crocidura denti) is a species of mammal in the family Soricidae. It is found in Cameroon, Central African Republic, Republic of the Congo, Democratic Republic of the Congo, Equatorial Guinea, Gabon, Guinea, Liberia, Nigeria, Sierra Leone, and Uganda. Its natural habitats are subtropical or tropical moist lowland forest and moist savanna.

References

Dent's shrew
Mammals of West Africa
Fauna of Central Africa
Dent's shrew
Taxonomy articles created by Polbot